This is a list of fictional dogs in animation, and is subsidiary to the list of fictional dogs. It is a collection of various notable dogs that are featured in animated works including traditional animation, stop-motion animation, or CGI/computer animation.

References

Animation
Dogs